is a Japanese Nippon Professional Baseball pitcher for the Orix Buffaloes.

Early baseball career
Akira began pitching in third grade, then went on to become the ace of Kuwanoyama Junior High where he led his school in winning the prefectural championship.

In his sophomore high school year, he pitched 2 consecutive complete games, and brought his team to the quarterfinals of Spring Koshien. The next year, his school made it to Summer Koshien, but got eliminated in the 1st round (2-1), despite him finishing the game with 99 pitches without relief nor walks issued.

In October 2010, he submitted his application for the 2010 Nippon Professional Baseball draft, with the condition that he will only turn pro should he receive 4th nomination or higher. Otherwise, he would join the industrial leagues.

Hanshin Tigers

The Tigers selected him as their 4th pick on October 28, and he signed a contract for an annual salary of 6 million yen, plus a 40 million yen signing bonus.

2011

He spent his first year playing in Western League games (minors), where he pitched 6 games, recorded 1 save and an ERA of 2.84.

2012

He continued pitching in ni-gun games, and recorded his 1st shutout game against Orix in August. His success in ni-gun paid off, and he finally made it to the active roster on September 8. The following day, he debuted as a starter against the Dragons in Nagoya Dome, where he pitched 6 shutout innings (2 hits) and recorded his first pro victory. With this, he became the 13th Hanshin pitcher to record a win on his first outing, and just the 4th pitcher out of high school to do so, the last one being Osamu Nishimura in 1951. He was temporarily demoted to ni-gun to make way for additional players in the active roster, but on his 2nd outing against the Swallows, he again recorded another win, making him the 3rd pitcher in franchise history to do so since Yukio Nishimura in 1937. On October 5, he would have been the first ever Hanshin pitcher to win all of his first 3 career starts, but due to a fielding error by Ryota Arai that resulted to a run and the lack of run support from the lineup, he earned his first career loss despite surrendering only 3 hits and no runs in 6 innings of work.

He finished the season with a 2–1 record and a 0.00 ERA.

2013

He again spent the first half of the season playing in ni-gun. His first appearance came on August 1 against the Dragons, where he pitted against 48-year-old veteran Masahiro Yamamoto in what was called the battle of pitchers with the widest age gap in NPB history (27 years, 2 months). But despite the advantage of youth, Iwamoto suffered the loss when he gave up 2 runs in 4 innings, and was consequently taken off the roster the following day.

He remained in the second squad for the rest of the season, and out of 18 starts, he finished with a dismal 3–7 win-loss record, and overall ERA of 3.95.

2014

He joined the ichi-gun spring training camp in Okinawa. Pitching Coach Nakanishi saw his potential as a long reliever and was appointed as such during the pre-season exhibition games. He appeared on April 1 as a closer against the Dragons, and gave up 1 run in an inning. He appeared for 3 more games until May 29 as a closer, but never saw any more playing time in ichi-gun afterwards.

Fukui Miracle Elephants

Orix Buffaloes 
On July 7, 2018, Iwamoto signed a contract with the Orix Buffaloes.

Playing Style
Listed at 182 centimeters, Iwamoto is a right-handed pitcher who throws mostly fastballs, the occasional slider, and forkballs as changeup. He tries to emulate Tsunemi Tsuda, a former Hiroshima Carp pitcher and reliever who went to the same high school as he did. He has been called "Tsuda the 2nd" because his 150 km/h fastball is reminiscent of the late pitcher.

References

External links

NPB Stats
Scoresway.com

Living people
1992 births
Hanshin Tigers players
Orix Buffaloes players
Japanese baseball players
Nippon Professional Baseball pitchers
Baseball people from Yamaguchi Prefecture